Paul Francis Schmidt (January 29, 1934 – February 19, 1999) was an American translator, poet, playwright, and essayist.

Biography
He graduated from Nashua High School in 1951, Colgate University in 1955, and studied at Harvard University.

He studied mime with Marcel Marceau and acting with Jacques Charon.

He served in the U.S. Army Intelligence, from 1958 to 1960.

Schmidt was professor at the University of Texas at Austin, from 1967 to 1976. He also taught at the Yale School of Drama.

He translated Euripides, Chekhov, Velimir Khlebnikov, Brecht, Genet, Gogol, Marivaux, and Mayakovsky.

He wrote three plays, one of which, Black Sea Follies won the Helen Hayes Award, and the Joseph Kesselring Prize for best play.

Schmidt's work was profiled in The New York Review of Books.

He was married to Stockard Channing.

He is buried at Green-Wood Cemetery, Brooklyn, New York.

Bibliography

Night Life, Painted Leaf Press, 1996,  
Winter Solstice, Painted Leaf Press, 1996,

Translations
Arthur Rimbaud: Complete Works, 1975; HarperPerennial, 2000,  
Meyerhold at work, University of Texas Press, 1980,

Critical studies and reviews of Schmidt's work
 

The Plays of Anton Chekhov

References

External links
PAUL SCHMIDT WORKS WELL WITH GENIUSES
The Stray Dog Cabaret translated by Paul Schmidt
http://broadwayworld.com/people/Paul_Schmidt/

1934 births
1999 deaths
20th-century American dramatists and playwrights
20th-century American male writers
20th-century American poets
20th-century American translators
American male poets
American male dramatists and playwrights
People from Brooklyn
United States Army soldiers
Colgate University alumni
Harvard University alumni
Poets from New York (state)
University of Texas at Austin faculty
Yale University faculty
Russian–English translators
Burials at Green-Wood Cemetery